Pedro Oba Asu Mbengono (born 18 May 2000) is an Equatoguinean football who plays as a forward for Futuro Kings FC and the Equatorial Guinea national team.

International career
Oba was included in Rodolfo Bodipo's 23-men list for the 2018 African Nations Championship.

Statistics

International

International goals
Scores and results list Equatorial Guinea's goal tally first.

References

External links

2000 births
Living people
People from Mongomo
Equatoguinean footballers
Association football forwards
Deportivo Niefang players
Futuro Kings FC players
Equatorial Guinea international footballers
2021 Africa Cup of Nations players
Equatorial Guinea A' international footballers
2018 African Nations Championship players